BTH may refer to:

 Bachelor of Theology (B.Th.)
 Bacterial two-hybrid system, a genetic technique to detect interactions among proteins
 Benzothiadiazole (disambiguation)
 Blekinge Institute of Technology (Blekinge Tekniska Högskola), Sweden
 British Thomson-Houston, a British engineering and heavy industrial company
 British Transport Hotels
 California Business, Transportation and Housing Agency, US
 Hang Nadim International Airport, Batam, Indonesia (IATA: BTH)
 Bone Thugs-n-Harmony, American hip hop group